Juan Manuel Cobo Gálvez (born 26 November 1984) is an Argentine professional footballer who plays as a midfielder for Italian club S.S.D. Jesina Calcio.

Titles 
 Arsenal de Sarandí 2012 (Torneo Clausura Primera División Argentina Championship), 2013 (Copa Argentina)

References

External links
 
 
 
 

1984 births
Living people
Argentine footballers
Argentine expatriate footballers
Thrasyvoulos F.C. players
Elche CF players
Olimpo footballers
Quilmes Atlético Club footballers
Instituto footballers
Arsenal de Sarandí footballers
O'Higgins F.C. footballers
Argentinos Juniors footballers
Club Atlético Banfield footballers
Independiente Rivadavia footballers
U.S.D. Città di Fasano players
Football League (Greece) players
Chilean Primera División players
Argentine Primera División players
Primera Nacional players
Segunda División players
Serie D players
Argentine expatriate sportspeople in Chile
Argentine expatriate sportspeople in Greece
Argentine expatriate sportspeople in Spain
Argentine expatriate sportspeople in Italy
Expatriate footballers in Chile
Expatriate footballers in Greece
Expatriate footballers in Spain
Expatriate footballers in Italy
Association football midfielders
Footballers from Córdoba, Argentina